Michael Kenna (born 1953) is an English photographer best known for his unusual black and white landscapes featuring ethereal light achieved by photographing at dawn or at night with exposures of up to 10 hours. His photos concentrate on the interaction between ephemeral atmospheric condition of the natural landscape, and human-made structures and sculptural mass.

Many books have been published of his work, the subjects of which range from The Rouge, in Dearborn Michigan, to the snow-covered island of Hokkaido, Japan. Kenna's work is also held in permanent collections at the Bibliothèque Nationale, Paris, The National Gallery of Art, Washington DC, Tokyo Metropolitan Museum of Photography, and the Victoria and Albert Museum in London.

Biography 
Kenna was born in 1953 in the industrial town of Widnes in the northwest of England. Kenna grew up with five siblings in a poor, working-class, Irish-Catholic family. He attended seminary school for seven years (until age 17), with the intention of becoming a priest. After discovering his talent for art, he decided against joining the holy priesthood in favor of a more creative career, despite the fact that his family would not have considered his interest a realistic livelihood option.

After a year at the Banbury School of Art, where he received his first photographic instruction, Kenna applied to the London College of Printing in both the graphic design and commercial photography departments, figuring he would go with the one that accepted him first (he graduated from the latter, in 1976). While pursuing his hobby of landscape photography, he took every chance to practice his craft commercially. He photographed theater dress rehearsals, and for record companies and the press; assisted other photographers, and sold stock photos of Henri Cartier-Bresson, Cornell Capa, Marc Riboud and Jacques-Henri Lartigue for the John Hillelson Agency on Fleet Street.

In 1977, Kenna moved to San Francisco for the opportunity to show and sell his work in galleries. There, he met Ruth Bernhard, who hired him as her printer in 1977. Over the next eight years, she introduced him to the creative potential of the printing process, in her unique methods of manipulating and interpreting a negative.

Work
Kenna's photography focuses on unusual landscapes with ethereal light achieved by photographing at dawn or at night with exposures of up to 10 hours. Since about 1986 he has mainly used Hasselblad medium format and Holga cameras and this accounts for the square format of most of his photographs. The main exception was for the photographs in Monique's Kindergarten for which a 4×5 large format camera was employed.

His work has been shown in galleries and museum exhibitions in Asia, Australia and Europe. He has photographs in the collections of the National Gallery of Art in Washington, D.C., the Patrimoine photographique in Paris, the Museum of Decorative Arts in Prague, and the Victoria and Albert Museum in London.  His photography of the ruins of concentration camps was featured in the opening credits of the Holocaust film Esther's Diary (2010).

Kenna has also done commercial work for such clients as Volvo, Rolls-Royce, Audi, Sprint, Dom Perignon and The Spanish Tourism Board.

In 2000, the Ministry of Culture in France made Kenna a Chevalier in the Order of Arts and Letters.

Publications
 Michael Kenna Photographs. Stephen Wirtz Gallery and The Weston Gallery, 1984
 The Hound of the Baskervilles. Arion, 1985; Northpoint, 1986
 1976-1986. Gallery Min, 1987
 Night Walk. Friends of Photography, 1988
 Michael Kenna. Min Gallery, 1990
 Le Desert de Retz. Arion, 1990
 The Elkhorn Slough and Moss Landing. The Elkhorn Slough Foundation, 1991
 A Twenty Year Retrospective. Treville, 1994; Portland, OR: Nazraeli, 2002
 The Rouge. Ram, 1995
 The Silverado Squatters. Arion, 1996
 Monique's Kindergarten. Portland, OR: Nazraeli, 1997
 Le Notre's Gardens. The Huntington Library, Art Collections Library and RAM Publishing, 1997 and 1999
 Night Work. Portland, OR: Nazraeli, 2000
 Impossible to Forget: The Nazi Camps Fifty Years After. Marval; Nazraeli, 2001
 Easter Island. Portland, OR: Nazraeli, 2001
 Japan. Portland, OR: Nazraeli; Treville, 2002
 Calais Lace. Portland, OR: Nazraeli, 2003
 Boarding School. Portland, OR: Nazraeli, 2003
 Ratcliffe Power Station. OR: Nazraeli, 2004
 Retrospective Two. Portland, OR: Nazraeli; Treville, 2004
 Hokkaido. Portland, OR: Nazraeli, 2005
 Montecito Garden. Portland, OR: Nazraeli, 2007
 Mont St Michel. Portland, OR: Nazraeli, 2007
 Mont-Saint-Michel. 21st, 2007
 Images of the Seventh Day, 2011
 In France. Portland, OR: Nazraeli, 2012
 Abruzzo. Italy, OR: Nazraeli, 2017
 One Sunday in Beijing. Paris: Bessard, 2018. Edition of 700 copies.
Beyond Architecture. Prestel, NY, London, Munich. 2019 
Northern England 1983–1986. Paso Robles, California: Nazraeli, 2021. .

Awards

 Imogen Cunningham Award, San Francisco, California, USA, 1981
 Art in Public Buildings Award, California Arts Council Commission, Sacramento, California, USA, 1987
 Institute for Aesthetic Development Award, Pasadena, California, USA, 1989
 Golden Saffron Award, Consuegra, Spain, 1996
 Chevalier of the Order of Arts and Letters, Ministry of Culture, France, 2000
 Honorary Master of Arts, Brooks Institute, Santa Barbara, California, USA, 2003
 Hae-sun Lee Photography Award, Photographic Artist Association of Korea, Seoul, Korea, 2013
 Special Photographer Award, Higashikawa, Hokkaido, Japan, 2016

References

External links
 
 Interview with Kenna by Tim Baskerville
 About Monique's Kindergarten by John Paul Caponigro

1953 births
Photographers from Lancashire
Photography in Japan
Living people
People from Widnes